Kautz Creek Falls is a waterfall on Kautz Creek in the Mount Rainier National Park in the state of Washington. The falls consist of two parts, each with two distinct tiers. One of these parts flows from the upper lobe of the Kautz Glacier and disappears under the lower lobe. The water flowing over this stage is generally clear. As the water passes underneath the lower lobe, however; it has a muddy appearance caused by glacial moraine, which explains the muddy appearance of Kautz Creek.

On Pearl Creek (a sub-tributary of Kautz Creek) a few miles to the west, is Pearl Falls.

References

Mount Rainier National Park
Waterfalls of Pierce County, Washington
Waterfalls of Washington (state)